cis-2,3-Butylene carbonate is an organic compound with formula , or (H3C)2(C2H2)(CO3).  It is an ester with a carbonate functional group bonded to both free ends of the cis-2,3-butylene group.  It is also a heterocyclic compound with a five-membered ring containing two oxygen atoms, and can be viewed as a derivative of dioxolane, namely cis-4,5-dimethyl-1,3-dioxolan-2-one.

The compound is an aprotic polar solvent.

The bacterium Pseudomonas diminuta will hydrolyze this compound but not its stereoisomer trans-2,3-Butylene carbonate, yielding cis-2,3-butanediol.  This has been proposed as an efficient route to produce the latter from a racemic mixture of 2,3-butylene carbonates.

See also
trans-2,3-Butylene carbonate, a stereoisomer
1,2-Butylene carbonate
Propylene carbonate

References

Solvents
Carbonate esters